The men's 400 metres hurdles event at the 2017 Summer Universiade was held on 24, 25 and 26 August at the Taipei Municipal Stadium.

Medalists

Results

Heats
Qualification: First 3 in each heat (Q) and next 6 fastest (q) qualified for the semifinals.

Semifinals
Qualification: First 2 in each heat (Q) and the next 2 fastest (q) qualified for the final.

Final

References

400
2017